Elizabeth A. Craig is a Steenbock Professor of Microbial Science and faculty member in the Biochemistry Department at the University of Wisconsin-Madison. She was elected to the National Academy of Sciences in 1998. Research in her laboratory concentrates on the folding and remodeling of proteins in the cell via molecular chaperones.

Education
Craig earned her bachelor's degree from the University of Rhode Island and her Ph.D. from the Washington University School of Medicine in St. Louis, Missouri in 1972.

Career
Craig joined the faculty at the University of Wisconsin-Madison in 1979. She has a joint appointment in the Biochemistry and Genetics departments.

References

External links
 Craig et al publications on Pubmed

University of Rhode Island alumni
Washington University School of Medicine alumni
Members of the United States National Academy of Sciences
American women biochemists
University of Wisconsin–Madison faculty
Living people
Year of birth missing (living people)